Akarna Dhanurasana (IAST: Ākarṇa Dhanurāsana), also called the Archer pose, Bow and Arrow pose, or Shooting Bow pose is an asana in hatha yoga and modern yoga as exercise. The posture resembles an archer about to release an arrow.

Etymology and origins

The name of the pose is from Sanskrit कर्ण Karṇa, "ear" with the prefix Ā, "towards" or "near". धनुर Dhanura means "bow" and आसन asana means "posture" or "seat". The name alludes to a myth in the Ramayana in which the infant Sita is able to lift Shiva's enormous bow, and when she reaches marriageable age, only Rama is able to wield it, and so become her husband.

The pose is shown as Dhanurāsana in the 19th century Sritattvanidhi. It has its modern name in the 1966 Light on Yoga.

Description
Akarna Dhanurasana involves pulling the foot towards the ear from a seated position with the legs outstretched.

The pose can be prepared for with Marichyasana; Baddha Konasana is sometimes used to lead into Akarna Dhanurasana.

References

Sitting asanas
Asymmetric asanas